Woorinen North is a locality in the local government area of the Rural City of Swan Hill, Victoria, Australia. Dorrington post office opened on 6 January 1921, was renamed Woorinen North on 1 March 1922 and was closed on 19 November 1976.

References

Towns in Victoria (Australia)
Rural City of Swan Hill